Bridget Jones is a fictional character created by Helen Fielding.

Bridget or Bridgette Jones may also refer to:
 Bridget Jones (film series), a British-American romantic comedy film series
 Bridget Jones (academic) (1935–2000), British scholar of Caribbean literature
 Bridget Jones Nelson (born 1964), American screenwriter
 Bridget Jones the tree, contestant on British reality TV series Sexy Beasts
 Bridgette Jones, a member of the mid-1990s London band Fluffy